Georgina is a given name and the feminine form of George, along with Georgia and Georgiana.  It comes from the Greek word γεωργός(γέω,"earth"+έργο,"work"), meaning farmer. It may refer to:

People
Georgina Bardach (born 1983), Argentine swimmer
Georgina Beyer (born 1957), New Zealand politician
Georgina Bloomberg (born 1983), American equestrian
Georgina Bouzova (born 1976), British actress
Georgina Brandolini d'Adda (born 1949), French-Brazilian fashion executive
Georgina Cates (born 1975), British actress
Georgina Chang, Singaporean journalist
Georgina Chapman (born 1976), British fashion designer and actress
Georgina Coleridge (1916–2003), Scottish journalist, magazine editor and publishing executive
Georgina Corrick (born 1999), British softball player
Georgina de Albuquerque (1885–1962), Brazilian painter
Georgina Downs (born 1972), British environmentalist
Georgina Evers-Swindell (born 1978), New Zealand rower
Georgina Febres-Cordero (1861–1925), Venezuelan nun
Georgina Fitzalan-Howard, Duchess of Norfolk (born 1962)
Georgina Gascoyne-Cecil, Marchioness of Salisbury (1827–1899)
Georgina Hagen (born 1991), British actress
Georgina Haig (born 1985), Australian actress
Georgina Hale (born 1943), British actress
Georgina Harland (born 1978), British athlete
Georgina Henry (1960–2014), British journalist
Georgina Herrera (1936–2021), Cuban writer
Georgina Hogarth (1827–1917), British housekeeper and editor
Georgina Lázaro (born 1965), Puerto Rican poet
Georgina Leonidas (born 1990), British actress
Georgina Lewis (born 1974), Australian journalist
Georgina Mace (1953–2020), British scientist
Georgina McGuinness (born 1966), Australian journalist
Georgina Montagu, British journalist and author
Georgina Pope (1862–1938), Canadian nurse
Georgina Póta (born 1985), Hungarian table tennis player
Georgina Reilly (born 1986), Canadian actress
Georgina Rizk (born 1953), Lebanese model
Georgina Rylance (born 1978), British actress
Georgina Parkinson (1938–2009), English ballet dancer and ballet mistress
Georgina Sherrington (born 1985), British actress
Georgina Somerset (1923–2013), first openly intersex person in the United Kingdom.
Georgina Spelvin, (born 1936), stage name of Shelley Bob Graham, an American former pornographic actress and performer
Georgina Starr (born 1968), British artist
Georgina Stirling (1866–1935), Canadian opera singer
Georgina Stojiljković (born 1988), Serbian fashion model
Georgina Sweet (1875–1946), Australian zoologist
Georgina te Heuheu (born 1943), New Zealand politician
Georgina Verbaan (born 1979), Dutch actress and singer
Georgina Ward, Countess of Dudley (1846–1929)
Georgina Wheatcroft (born 1965), Canadian curler
Georgina Theodora Wood (born 1947), Ghanaian judge

Pseudonym
Georgina Spelvin, variant on George Spelvin, a traditional American theatre pseudonym

Fiction 

Georgina Hobart, fictional character in the Netflix series, The Politician
Georgina Jones, fictional character in the British television series Adam Adamant Lives!
Georgina Kincaid, fictional character in novels by Richelle Mead
Georgina Kirrin, fictional character nicknamed "George" in Enid Blyton's Famous Five series
Georgina Orwell, fictional character in Lemony Snicket's A Series of Unfortunate Events book series
Georgina Sparks, fictional character in the Gossip Girl books and television series
Vitay Georgina, a fictional character, in a Magda Szabó book (Abigél)

See also
Georgina (disambiguation)
Gina (given name)
Jiřina

Feminine given names